James Randall Couchman (born 11 February 1942) is a retired British Conservative politician.

Early life
He was educated at Cranleigh School and the University of Newcastle and was a London Borough of Bexley councillor from 1974 to 1982. He later served as a county councillor in Oxfordshire from 2005 until he retired in 2013.

Political career
Couchman first stood for Parliament at Chester-le-Street in 1979, but was beaten by Labour's Giles Radice.

He was Member of Parliament (MP) for Gillingham from 1983 until his defeat in 1997 by Labour's Paul Clark.

References

 "Times Guide to the House of Commons", Times Newspapers Limited, 1997 edition.

External links 

1942 births
Living people
People educated at Cranleigh School
Conservative Party (UK) MPs for English constituencies
UK MPs 1983–1987
UK MPs 1987–1992
UK MPs 1992–1997